Anthony Philip French (November 19, 1920 – February 3, 2017) was a British professor of physics at the Massachusetts Institute of Technology. He was born in Brighton, England.  French was a graduate of Cambridge University, receiving his B.A. in 1942 and Ph.D. in 1948, both in physics.  In 1942, he began working on the British effort to build an atomic bomb (codenamed Tube Alloys) at the Cavendish Laboratory.  By 1944, Tube Alloys had been merged with the American Manhattan Project and he was sent to Los Alamos.

When the war ended, he returned to the United Kingdom, where he spent a couple of years at the newly formed Atomic Energy Research Establishment.  He later joined the faculty at Cambridge, where he conducted his research at Cavendish and became a Fellow and Director of Studies in Natural Sciences at Pembroke College, Cambridge.  In 1955, French arrived at the University of South Carolina, where he was made chairman of the physics department.  He left South Carolina in 1962 to take a faculty position in the MIT Physics Department, where he remained until his death.  French's main interest was undergraduate physics education.  He was chairman of the Commission on Physics Education of the International Union of Pure and Applied Physics (1975-1981) and president of the American Association of Physics Teachers (1985-1986).  He was also a Fellow of the American Physical Society.

Books

Awards and honors
 1980 University Medal of the Charles University, Prague
 1988 Lawrence Bragg Medal of the Institute of Physics, London
 1989 Oersted Medal of the American Association of Physics Teachers
 1991 Named Professor Emeritus at MIT
 1993 Melba Newell Phillips Medal of the American Association of Physics Teachers

References

External links

2008 Video Interview with Anthony French by Atomic Heritage Foundation Voices of the Manhattan Project
1992 Video Video Interview with Anthony French by Los Alamos Historical Society Voices of the Manhattan Project
Anthony French's web page at MIT
1992 Video interview with Anthony French by Theresa Strottman Voices of the Manhattan Project
Anthony French's obituary

1920 births
2017 deaths
Massachusetts Institute of Technology School of Science faculty
Manhattan Project people
Fellows of the American Physical Society
British expatriates in the United States
Alumni of the University of Cambridge